Brezovica v Podbočju is a small settlement in the eastern Gorjanci Hills in the Municipality of Krško in eastern Slovenia, close to the border with Croatia. The area is part of the traditional region of Lower Carniola. It is now included in the Lower Sava Statistical Region. It includes the hamlet of Trebelnik (in older sources also Trebelnič).

Name
The name of the settlement was changed from Brezovica to Brezovica v Podbočju in 1953.

References

External links
Brezje v Podbočju on Geopedia

Populated places in the Municipality of Krško